Nathaniel Oliver (born December 13, 1940 in St. Petersburg, Florida)  had a seven-year major league career in the 1960s, mostly with the Los Angeles Dodgers.

Playing career

Oliver was signed by the Los Angeles Dodgers in 1959. He hit just .224 for the Green Bay Blue Jays and Fox Cities Foxes that year. In 1960, he hit .329 for the Great Falls Electrics and appeared ever so briefly for the St. Paul Saints. He played in the minors for the Spokane Indians in 1961-65 and in 1967, topping .300 in '62-'63. He came up to the majors for the first time in 1963, a year the Dodgers won the World Series. He appeared in 65 games, playing primarily second base, and hitting .239. He did not play in the World Series.

The next year, in 1964 at age 23, Oliver had his most at-bats in the major leagues, getting 321 at-bats in 99 games. He hit .243 with 9 doubles and stole 7 bases.

In 1965 he appeared in only 8 games with the Dodgers, but in 1966 he played in 80 games with a .193 average. He appeared in game 4 of the World Series as a pinch-runner.

In 1967, his batting average improved to .237 in 77 games.

In the off-season, he was traded to the San Francisco Giants in the deal involving Ron Hunt and Tom Haller. He appeared in only 36 games in 1968, hitting .178/.189/.205.

In the off-season before 1969, he was traded to the Yankees, and played one game with them before they traded him to the Cubs, where he finished out his career in 44 games hitting .159. It was the Cubs team that everyone expected to win the division, but finished second instead. Glenn Beckert was the regular second baseman and played amongst infielders Ernie Banks, Ron Santo, and Don Kessinger.

Coaching career
In 1989, Oliver managed the Arizona League Angels, and in 1990-91 he was at the helm of the Palm Springs Angels. In 1998, Oliver managed the Arizona League Cubs and in 1999 managed the Daytona Cubs, and in 2000 was a roving infield instructor in the Cubs organization. In 2003, he took over the managerial reins of the Saskatoon Legends of the Canadian Baseball League in mid-season from Ron LeFlore.

In 2006, Oliver was the bunting instructor for the Chicago White Sox organization.

Personal
Oliver is the son of Jim Oliver, Sr., who had played in the Negro leagues.  James Oliver Field in St. Petersburg was named in the senior Oliver's memory, and was the first field to be refurbished under the Tampa Bay Devil Rays Field Renovation Programs. Oliver's brother, Jim, also played professional baseball.

References

External links

1940 births
Living people
Major League Baseball third basemen
Los Angeles Dodgers players
San Francisco Giants players
New York Yankees players
Chicago Cubs players
Baseball players from St. Petersburg, Florida
Minor league baseball managers
Green Bay Bluejays players
Fox Cities Foxes players
St. Paul Saints (AA) players
Great Falls Electrics players
Spokane Indians players
Tacoma Cubs players
Hawaii Islanders players
Tucson Toros players
Reno Silver Sox players
African-American baseball players
21st-century African-American people
20th-century African-American sportspeople